Inflicted insight is a possible consequence for subjects participating in certain kinds of research.  It occurs when the subject is given insight into his or her flaws through his or her participation in an experiment, often unexpectedly or causing emotional pain.  It is especially likely in social and psychological research and especially when that research involves deception of the subject by the researcher.

The Milgram experiment is a well-known example of an experiment with a very high potential for inflicted insight.  Through their participation in the experiment, many subjects realized that they were capable of committing acts of extreme violence on other human beings.  After having this realization, many subjects experienced prolonged symptoms of anxiety.
(However, 84 percent of former participants surveyed later said they were "glad" or "very glad" to have participated.)

Deceptive debriefing is one method for avoiding inflicted insight in psychological experiments, although it is considered ethically questionable in and of itself.

The American Psychological Association's guidelines for ethical experimentation strongly discourage experiments where deceptive debriefing is the only alternative to inflicted insight.  However, such experiments may be deemed ethically acceptable if they are counterbalanced by other ethical concerns.

References

External links 
  Institutional Review Board; The Cost of Deception. 1979
  Principles of ethical conduct in the treatment of subjects; American Psychological Association.

Medical ethics
Human subject research